Euclides Scalco (16 September 1932 – 16 March 2021) was a Brazilian politician who co-founded the Brazilian Social Democracy Party and served as a Deputy from 1979-1991. Scalco died from COVID-19 on 16 March 2021 in Curitiba during the COVID-19 pandemic in Brazil.

References

1932 births
2021 deaths
Brazilian politicians
Deaths from the COVID-19 pandemic in Paraná (state)